Heal the Bay Aquarium, previously named the Santa Monica Pier Aquarium, is a private-public aquarium at a California State Beach Park managed by Los Angeles County Department of Beaches and Harbors, located beneath the Santa Monica Pier, adjacent to the Pacific Ocean. Since 2003, it is operated by Heal the Bay, a nonprofit organization. It was formerly known as the Ocean Discovery Center and was operated by UCLA until 2003.

As Heal the Bay's marine education, advocacy, and community science facility, it is open to the general public and attracts more than 100,000 visitors from around the world per year (approximately 15,000 are students). This facility offers educational programs, activities, and special events dedicated to marine conservation, pollution prevention, and environmental education. 

Species on display include:

Octopus incident 
In February 2009 the two-spotted octopus managed to manipulate the pipe connection that takes care of draining the water tank. Two hundred gallons of water from the valve flooded the visitor space. The event received significant media attention.

External links

Heal the Bay Aquarium website
Heal the Bay website

References 

Buildings and structures in Santa Monica, California
Aquaria in California
Tourist attractions in Santa Monica, California
Companies based in Santa Monica, California